Veragua or Veraguas was the name of five Spanish colonial territorial entities in Central America, beginning in the 16th century during the Spanish colonization of the Americas.

The term was based on a Central American indigenous peoples name for the region. It was used for colonial territories in present-day Costa Rica, Nicaragua, and Panama.

Territorial entities
The Spanish colonial territorial entities with the name Veragua include:

Governorate of Veragua — 1502–1537
The Governorate of Veragua (Gobernación de Veragua) (1502–1537) included the Caribbean coast of present-day Nicaragua (Mosquito Coast) and Costa Rica and the coast of Panama as far as the Río Belén, namely, the coastline explored by Christopher Columbus on his fourth voyage, in 1502. It was this area that Columbus (and his heirs) claimed as his private domain, but which the Crown did not recognize. Spanish governors of this territory were Diego de Nicuesa and Felipe Gutiérrez y Toledo.

Duchy of Veragua — 1537–1560
The Duchy of Veragua, created in 1537 from the Gobernación de Veragua in territory now belonging to Panama. The first duke was Luis Colón y Toledo, grandson and heir of Columbus, who received the title after a long lawsuit with the Crown of Castile. In 1556 he returned the territory to the Crown but retained the ducal title.

Royal Veragua — 1537–1540
Royal Veragua (Veragua Real) (1537–1540) included those territories of the Governorate of Veragua not included in the Duchy of Veragua. These territories were in two parts, with the duchy separating them. In 1540 the western part, together with territories from Castilla de Oro, became the Province of Nuevo Cartago y Costa Rica within the Spanish Captaincy General of Guatemala (Kingdom of Guatemala).

Province of Veragua — 1560–1821
The Province of Veragua, formed in 1560 from territories formerly in the Duchy of Veragua. Its first governor was Francisco Vázquez. This territory, slightly expanded to the west and the south, became a dependency of the Intendencia of Panama, and in 1821, of the Republic of Colombia.

Present day
Veraguas Province
Veraguas Province is a present-day Province of the Republic of Panama.

See also
Indigenous peoples of Costa Rica
Indigenous peoples of Panama
Subdivisions of the Spanish Empire

References
This article is a free translation of the article Veragua at the Spanish Wikipedia, accessed February 2, 2007.

Colonial Central America
Colonial Panama
History of Nicaragua
History of Costa Rica
Governorates of the Spanish Empire
Provinces of the Spanish Empire
1500s in North America
1510s in North America
1520s in North America
1530s in North America
1560 in North America
16th century in Central America
Spanish colonization of the Americas